Grant Thomas (born 1941) is a New Zealand politician. He was the Member of Parliament for Hamilton West from 1990 to 1993, and a Hamilton city councillor from 1995 to 2007, including a period as deputy mayor.

Biography
Thomas was born in 1941 and educated at Southwell School and Hamilton Boys' High School.

In the 1990 election Thomas stood for the National Party, taking the Hamilton West electorate from Trevor Mallard. However he lost it to Labour's Martin Gallagher in the 1993 election.

Thomas was a Hamilton city councillor from 1995 to 2007, when he stood down. Thomas served under five mayors during his twelve years of office in the council. In 2003 a comment about then-mayor David Braithwaite being a dictator prompted fellow councillor Bill Ward to question Thomas' support for the mayor. This led to Jody Garrett nominating Ward in a bid to replace Thomas as deputy mayor. The move ultimately failed, with ten councillors backing Thomas and only four supporting Ward.

In 2005 Thomas claimed that the 13 members of the city council were excessive, saying "[their] salary is too high for the workload". By reducing the number to ten, Thomas explained that the council could save NZ$150,000 annually.

Thomas now lives in Perth, Australia, with his family.

References

 

1941 births
Living people
New Zealand National Party MPs
Deputy mayors of places in New Zealand
Hamilton City Councillors
People from Hamilton, New Zealand
Members of the New Zealand House of Representatives
New Zealand MPs for North Island electorates
Unsuccessful candidates in the 1993 New Zealand general election